The Night Strangler is an American made for television horror film which first aired on ABC on January 16, 1973, as a sequel to The Night Stalker.

The Night Strangler proved almost as popular as its predecessor garnering strong ratings and eventually prompting ABC to order a TV series (neither writer Richard Matheson nor producer/director Dan Curtis was involved in the TV series). In the United States, the TV movie ran (without commercials) approximately 74 minutes. ABC planned to release the film overseas as a theatrical release and had additional footage shot rounding out the movie to 90 minutes.

Plot
In 1973, reporter Carl Kolchak (Darren McGavin), now in Seattle, Washington (having been run out of Las Vegas at the end of the last film), is hired by his former editor, Tony Vincenzo (Simon Oakland) to cover a series of killings in which the victims, all exotic dancers, are strangled, have their necks crushed and are then drained of a few ounces of blood.  A coroner's report also reveals that the victims all had traces of rotting flesh on their necks.

Researcher Titus Berry (Wally Cox) discovers that there was a similar rash of killings in 1952, setting Kolchak on the trail of another unbelievable story. Kolchak is stonewalled by the police, who want to have certain details of the murders kept secret.  Out of "burning curiosity," Berry researches further back, and  learns of another series of murders in 1931.  Berry and Kolchak discover that similar murders have been occurring every 21 years since 1889, with each series of murders taking place over a period of 18 days.  Kolchak determines that the killer needs the blood for a kind of elixir of life which keeps him alive for 21 years at a time. Of course, no one believes Kolchak, and the powers that be want to silence him.

Berry uncovers further clues in an old interview with Mark Twain leading to a Dr. Richard Malcolm, a surgeon in the Union Army during the Civil War, who was one of the original staff at Seattle's Westside Mercy Hospital.  Though the hospital is long gone, Kolchak goes to the clinic standing on the site, in the hope that it might still have the hospital's old records, but he finds something far more important just inside the front door: a painting of the clinic's founder, a Dr. Malcolm Richards, who is the spitting image of Richard Malcolm.

Kolchak calls Berry to meet him there and proceeds to alter the painting to make the similarity more obvious. Berry is amazed, but the police are less than impressed, and Kolchak is arrested.

Finally, Kolchak and Berry convince the police (and their boss) of the facts: that the killer really is practically immortal, and that he will kill again. But the story is once again suppressed.

Kolchak, working with helpful exotic dancer Louise (Jo Ann Pflug), enters into a race against time to stop the killer before he is able to complete the creation of his elixir and disappear for another 21 years. In the Seattle Underground under the old clinic, Kolchak has a face-to-face confrontation with Dr. Malcolm/Richards (Richard Anderson); the night strangler admits having first tried the elixir in 1868 and that he had hoped to spread the knowledge of immortality until he started aging in 1889 and his family also died (their mummified remains are kept near the doctor's laboratory). He intends to continue each 21-year cycle until he can make the process permanent. Before the night strangler can drink his sixth dose of elixir, Kolchak smashes the beaker. The night strangler tries to kill Kolchak but fails due to rapid aging; as the police burst into the room the aging killer commits suicide by throwing himself outside a high window. The film concludes with a once-again unemployed Kolchak bickering with Vincenzo and Louise as Carl drives the three of them to New York City.

Cast

Darren McGavin as Carl Kolchak
Jo Ann Pflug as Louise Harper
Simon Oakland as Tony Vincenzo
Scott Brady as Capt. Roscoe Schubert
Wally Cox as Titus Berry
Margaret Hamilton as Prof. Hester Crabwell
John Carradine as Llewellyn Crossbinder
Al Lewis as Tramp
Nina Wayne as Charisma Beauty
Virginia Peters as Wilma Krankheimer
Kate Murtagh as Janie Watkins
Ivor Francis as Dr. Christopher Webb
Diane Shalet as Joyce Gabriel
Anne Randall as Policewoman Sheila
Francoise Birnheim as Restaurant Woman
Richard Anderson as Dr. Richard Malcolm/Dr. Malcolm Richards

Novelization of TV film
In the novelization  of The Night Strangler, it is strongly hinted that the immortal villain, Dr. Richard Malcolm, is actually the Count of St. Germain. When asked directly, Malcolm laughs ironically but does not deny it.

Sequel 
A third film was planned, based on a story by Richard Matheson, but completed by science fiction and horror novelist William F. Nolan; the two share credit on the unproduced script. The third film was set aside when ABC elected to order the television series and have it produced by Universal. None of the original participants, aside from actors Darren McGavin and Simon Oakland, appeared in the television series.

Titled The Night Killers and set in Honolulu, Hawaii, the script had Tony Vincenzo hiring Kolchak to work for him. Once again, Kolchak discovers a cover-up — this time involving a mysterious UFO, a nuclear power plant and important people being murdered and replaced by androids. Kolchak ties all of this together, believing that the aliens on the UFO landed on Earth intending to set up a colony and replacing key government figures with these androids to assist them in establishing their secret colony.

Home media
The film was released on a double feature DVD with The Night Stalker by MGM Home Entertainment in 2004.  Both films were given new transfers and issued (separately) on Blu-Ray and DVD by Kino Lorber in 2018.

See also
Kolchak: The Night Stalker, a 1974 television series based on the movies, also starring Darren McGavin.
Night Stalker, a 2005 remake of the original Kolchak series with Stuart Townsend as Carl Kolchak.
"Squeeze", an episode of The X-Files with a similar plot.

References

External links
 

1973 television films
1973 films
ABC Movie of the Week
American sequel films
Films about journalists
Films set in Seattle
Films directed by Dan Curtis
Films with screenplays by Richard Matheson
American horror television films
Television sequel films
Films adapted into comics
The Night Stalker (franchise)
1970s English-language films
1970s American films